Bernathonomus piperita is a moth of the family Erebidae. It is found in Costa Rica, Panama and Brazil.

References

Phaegopterina
Moths described in 1855